Xintian Station, is a station of Line 4 of Wuhan Metro. It entered revenue service on September 25, 2019. It is located in Caidian District.

Station layout

References

Wuhan Metro stations
Line 4, Wuhan Metro
Railway stations in China opened in 2019